Thomas Platter the Elder (10 February 1499, in Grächen, Valais – 26 January 1582, in Basel) was a Swiss humanist scholar and writer.

Biography
Thomas Platter (the Elder) was a master of several languages, knowing Latin, Greek, and Hebrew, among others. He grew up in poverty and, as a student, made a prolonged tour through Germany. After his return he first lived in Zürich, where he was an assistant to reformator Huldrych Zwingli. In 1531 he was an eye-witness of the Battle of Kappel, when Huldrych Zwingli was killed. Considering the political situation in Zürich after this war, he left for Basel, together with his paternal friend and mentor, the Protestant theologian Oswald Myconius. In Basel he earned himself a reputation as an early teacher of ancient languages and humanist studies. Together with Johannes Oporinus and Ruprecht Winter he led a printing house and published a large variety of classical editions. He demanded quite a high remuneration for it, which was approved, but under the condition he wouldn't disclose it to the public.

His autobiography mostly deals with his youth and the history of how he became a well-known humanist scholar. It was read by Johann Wolfgang von Goethe, and is one of the finest examples of the German autobiography of this time.

His sons Felix Platter and Thomas Platter the Younger both studied medicine, a thwarted ambition of Platter's own early life. Platter the Younger also kept a diary of travels in England which provided Shakespearean scholars with evidence for the dating of certain Shakespeare plays.

References

External links
 
 
 Platter's Autobiography, translated into English in 1839
 Excerpt relevant to Shakespeare and the Globe Theatre
 Thomas Platter: La mia vita dal sito giuliooraziobravi.it

1499 births
1582 deaths
People from Visp (district)
Swiss Renaissance humanists
16th-century Swiss educators
16th-century Swiss writers